Coleophora propinqua is a moth of the family Coleophoridae. It is found in Syria and the Palestinian Territories.

References

propinqua
Moths described in 1879
Moths of the Middle East